MHH may refer to:
 Marsh Harbour Airport's IATA code
  or Hannover Medical School
 Glenn de MHH
 Menstrual health and hygiene